The 1966 Idaho gubernatorial election was held on November 8. Republican nominee Don Samuelson defeated Democratic nominee Cecil Andrus with 41.4% of the vote in a four-way race (two independents).

In early August, three-term incumbent Robert E. Smylie, the dean of American governors, was soundly defeated in the Republican primary by Samuelson. Andrus was a close runner-up in the Democratic primary to Charles Herndon, who was killed in a plane crash six weeks later in September.

This was the sixth consecutive Republican victory for governor, but Democrats won the next six, with four by Andrus. The next gubernatorial election in 1970 was a rematch, with different results.

Primary elections
Primary elections were held on August 2, 1966.

Democratic primary

Candidates
Charles Herndon, Salmon attorney
Cecil Andrus, Orofino state senator
William J. Dee, Grangeville state senator

Results

Herndon was killed in a plane crash in the central Idaho mountains in mid-September.

Republican primary

Candidates
Don Samuelson, Sandpoint state senator
Robert E. Smylie, three-term incumbent governor

Results

General election

Candidates
Major party candidates
Don Samuelson, Republican 
Cecil Andrus, Democratic

Other candidates
Perry Swisher, Independent, Pocatello state senator (Republican)
Philip Jungert, Independent, Lewiston businessman (Democrat)

Results

References

1966
Idaho
Gubernatorial